Rachel (or Rachael) was launched at Bristol in 1795. She spent most of her career as a constant trader, sailing to and from Nevis. A French privateer captured her in 1803 but a Liverpool letter of marque quickly recaptured her. She was wrecked in July 1811.

Career
Rachael first appeared in Lloyd's Register (LR) in 1795. Subsequently, she made eleven voyages to Nevis.

Lloyd's List (LL) reported on 15 July 1803 that Rachael, Cooper, master, had been taken and retaken, while on her way from Nevis to Bristol. She had arrived at Liverpool. The capture had been off Cape Clear, and her recaptor was a Liverpool letter of marque.

Fate
Rachel, Power, master, was at Nevis when a gale hit the island between 6 and 9 July 1811. She herself was wrecked on 7 July; her crew was saved.

Citations

References
 

1795 ships
Ships built in Bristol
Age of Sail merchant ships of England
Captured ships
Maritime incidents in 1811
Shipwrecks in the Caribbean Sea